was a short-lived male spin-off idol group of Onyanko Club. They made their debut in 1986 with the song Boku-tachi no Season, and broke up after their February 15, 1987 concert at Nippon Budokan. The seven members of the group were Ken Iwashiro, Shūsuke Namiki, Yoshinori Satō, Yōji Sawamukai, Kō Shimizu, Hirotoshi Shinozaki and Hiromitsu Shizuku. After 3 decades, the group reunited in 2016 and has been active ever since.

Discography

Singles
Boku-tachi no Season/Kanojo wa Girlfriend, Epic/Sony, 07•5H-313, Single
Chotto Karai Aitsu/Kimagure na Kimi ga Suki, Epic/Sony, 07•5H-332, Single

Albums
Songs that do not indicate a specific vocalist are sung by the entire group.
7 Junk Boys, Epic/Sony, 28•3H-266, LP
A1. Zenryaku I Love You
A2. Boku-tachi no Season
A3. Meisō no Machi (Yōji Sawamukai)
A4. Jungle Boy (Hiromitsu Shizuku)
A5. Kanojo wa Girlfriend (Yoshinori Satō)
A6. Ai no Mune o Hatte
B1. Chotto Karai Aitsu
B2. Hoshi no Dōbōsha (Ken Iwashiro)
B3. Me-Cha-She (Shūsuke Namiki & Hirotoshi Shinozaki)
B4. Onshitsu Sodachi no Melon-tachi (Kō Shimizu)
B5. Kimagure na Kimi ga Suki (Yoshinori Satō)

A CD by the same title was released as well, with one extra track:
7 Junk Boys, Epic/Sony, 32•8H-102, January 21, 1987, CD
Zenryaku I Love You
Boku-tachi no Season
Meisō no Machi (Yōji Sawamukai)
Jungle Boy (Hiromitsu Shizuku)
Kanojo wa Girlfriend (Yoshinori Satō)
Ai no Mune o Hatte
Chotto Karai Aitsu
Hoshi no Dōbōsha (Ken Iwashiro)
Me-Cha-She (Shūsuke Namiki & Hirotoshi Shinozaki)
Onshitsu Sodachi no Melon-tachi (Kō Shimizu)
Kimagure na Kimi ga Suki (Yoshinori Satō)
Kimi o Idaite Mitai (CD version of Chotto Karai Aitsu)

Video releases
7 Junk Boys, Epic/Sony, VHS, 30 minutes, ¥4500This video of their final concert features the following songs:
Boku-tachi no Season
Zenryaku I Love You
Meisō no Machi
Jungle Boy
Me-Cha-She
Hoshi no Dōbōsha
Onshitsu Sodachi no Melon-tachi
Kanojo wa Girlfriend
Boku-tachi no Season (reprise)
Chotto Karai Aitsu

References

External links
 Camelot / Musukko Club
Official site

Japanese idol groups
Japanese boy bands
Japanese pop music groups
Musical groups established in 1986
Musical groups disestablished in 1987
1986 establishments in Japan
Musical groups from Tokyo